Epipsocetae is an infraorder of psocids in the order Psocodea (formerly Psocoptera). There are about 5 families and more than 480 described species in Epipsocetae.

Families
These five families belong to the infraorder Epipsocetae:
 Cladiopsocidae Smithers, 1972
 Dolabellopsocidae Eertmoed, 1973
 Epipsocidae Pearman, 1936 (elliptical barklice)
 Ptiloneuridae Roesler, 1940
 Spurostigmatidae Eertmoed, 1973

References

Further reading

External links

Psocomorpha